The Office of Health Affairs (OHA) is a component within the United States Department of Homeland Security. OHA provides health and medical expertise in support of the department's mission to prepare for, respond to, and recover from all hazards affecting the nation’s health security. This included the execution of ″Project BioWatch″, an early warning detection network of air samplers in more than 30 US cities.

The Office of Health Affairs was led by the Assistant Secretary of Homeland Security for Health Affairs, who also serves as the DHS chief medical officer and who is appointed by the President of the United States with confirmation by the United States Senate. The current assistant secretary is Katherine Brinsfield, MD, MPH. The OHA was absorbed into the DHS Countering WMD Office in 2018.

Budget

References

External links
DHS Office of Health Affairs official website

Office of Health Affairs